The Fighting Coward is a 1935 American crime film directed by Dan Milner.

Cast
 Ray Walker as Bob Horton
 Joan Woodbury as Marie Russell
 William Farnum as Jim Horton
 Earl Dwire as Police Chief John Russell
 Syd Saylor as Detective Hendricks
 Matthew Betz as Krane (as Mathew Betz)
 Clara Kimball Young as Mrs. Gordon

References

External links
 

1935 films
1935 crime films
American crime films
American black-and-white films
1930s English-language films
Films directed by Dan Milner
1930s American films